The Governor was an ITV television drama series that began in 1995 and ended in 1996, with just two series being broadcast. It was devised and written by Lynda La Plante, known for her hit television series Prime Suspect, which went on hiatus in the same year. Each episode of The Governor was forty-five minutes long, with the exception of the first episode which was double-length. La Plante felt that the series had reached a natural end and decided not to write any further episodes, therefore the last episode was broadcast on 27 April 1996, and ended with a cliffhanger that was not resolved. The series starred Janet McTeer and Derek Martin as prisoner governors Helen Hewitt and Gary Marshall respectively. The second season was shot in Ireland at various locations around Dublin including Wheatfield prison. The complete first series was released on DVD on 28 March 2011. The complete second series was released on 4 June 2012.

Cast

Prison officers
 Janet McTeer as Governor Helen Hewitt
 Derek Martin as Deputy Governor Gary Marshall
 Ron Donachie as Officer Russell Morgan 
 David Nicholls as Officer "Jumbo" Jackson
 Paul Kynman as Officer James Mallahide (Series 1)
 Idris Elba as Officer Donny Chiswick (Series 2)
 John Forgeham as Temporary Governor Ronald Wrexham (Series 2)

Prison inmates
 Eamonn Walker as Snoopy Oswald 
 Terry O'Neill as Victor Braithwaite/Tarzan
 Adrian Scarborough as Walter Brinkley (Series 1)
 Anthony Higgins as Norman Jones (Series 1)
 Robert Cavanah as Anthony Kelly (Series 1)
 Tim Meats as Alan Fisher (Series 1)
 Ian Curtis as Howard Webster (Series 1)
 Craig Charles as Eugene Buffy (Series 2)

Other prison staff
 Christine Moore as Mavis O'Connell 
 Sophie Okonedo as Moira Levitt (Series 1)
 Jeremy Sheffield as Dr. Thomas (Series 1)
 John Blakey as Dr. Cameron Williams (Series 2)

Episodes
Each episode of The Governor is generally sixty minutes long, however episode one of the first series was a feature-length episode, running for 102 mins. A total of twelve episodes of The Governor have aired to date. The list is ordered by the episodes' original air dates.

Series 1 (1995)

Series 2 (1996)

References

External links

1995 British television series debuts
1996 British television series endings
1990s British drama television series
1990s British crime television series
British prison television series
ITV television dramas
Television series by ITV Studios
Television series produced at Pinewood Studios
Television series by Yorkshire Television
English-language television shows